The Tataviam language was spoken by the Tataviam people of the upper Santa Clara River basin, Santa Susana Mountains, and Sierra Pelona Mountains in southern California. It had become extinct by 1916 and is known only from a few early records, notably a few words recorded by Alfred L. Kroeber and John P. Harrington in the early decades of the 20th century.  These word lists were not from native speakers, but from the children of the last speakers who remembered a few words and phrases.

Language family

Uto-Aztecan

Scholars have recognized Tataviam as belonging to the Uto-Aztecan language family, specifically the Takic branch.  Based on the most thorough and most recent analysis, it is part of the Serran group along with Kitanemuk and Serrano (Munro and Johnson, 2001).

Chumashan

An earlier alternative suggestion by some scholars is that Tataviam was a Chumashan language, from a Ventureño language and others, of the Chumash-Ventureño and other Chumash groups, that had been influenced by the neighboring Uto-Aztecan speaking peoples (Beeler and Klar 1977).  However, the Beeler and Klar proposal is based on a word-list collected by C. Hart Merriam while the Takic proposals are based on different word lists collected by Alfred Kroeber and John P. Harrington.  The current opinion is that the Merriam word lists represent a dialect of Ventureño (called Alliklik or Castac Chumash) and the Kroeber and Harrington word list represents a divergent Takic language (called Tataviam).

See also
Indigenous languages of California
Survey of California and Other Indian Languages
John Peabody Harrington
Native American history of California
Native Americans in California
Traditional narratives (Native California)

External links
Fernandeno Tataviam Band of Mission Indians, tribal government website
native-languages.org
Tataviam language overview at the Survey of California and Other Indian Languages

References
 Beeler, Madison, and Kathryn A. Klar. 1977. "Interior Chumash". Journal of California Anthropology 4:287-305.
 Bright, William. 1975. "The Alliklik Mystery". Journal of California Anthropology, 2:228-230.
 Goddard, Ives. 1996. "Introduction". In Languages, edited by Ives Goddard, pp. 1–16. Handbook of North American Indians, William C. Sturtevant, general editor, vol. 17. Smithsonian Institution, Washington, D.C.
 Hinton, Leanne. 1994. Flutes of Fire: Essays on California Indian Languages. Heyday Books, Berkeley, California.
 Hudson, Travis. 1982. "The Alliklik-Tataviam Problem". Journal of California and Great Basin Anthropology 4:222-232.
 Johnson, John R., and David D. Earle. 1990. "Tataviam Geography and Ethnohistory". Journal of California and Great Basin Anthropology 12:191-214.
 Pamela Munro with John Johnson.  2001.  "What Do We Know about Tataviam?  Comparisons with Kitanemuk, Gabrielino, Kawaiisu, and Tübatulabal," paper presented to the Friends of Uto-Aztecan Conference, Santa Barbara, California, July 9, 2001.
 King, Chester, and Thomas C. Blackburn. 1978. "Tataviam". In California, edited by Robert F. Heizer, pp. 535–537. Handbook of North American Indians, William C. Sturtevant, general editor, vol. 8. Smithsonian Institution, Washington, D.C.

Takic languages
Extinct languages of North America